Thomas Eichberger (born 20 August 1993) is an Austrian handball player for HSG Graz and the Austrian national team.

He represented Austria at the 2020 European Men's Handball Championship.

References

1993 births
Living people
Austrian male handball players
People from Judenburg
Sportspeople from Styria